Tomáš Jungwirth (24 November 1942 – 19 January 1998) was a Czech middle-distance runner. He competed in the men's 800 metres at the 1968 Summer Olympics.

References

1942 births
1998 deaths
Athletes (track and field) at the 1968 Summer Olympics
Czech male middle-distance runners
Olympic athletes of Czechoslovakia
Athletes from Prague